The 21st Ice Hockey World Championships and 32nd European ice hockey championships were held from 26 February to 7 March 1954 in Stockholm, Sweden.  Every team played each other once with the top three finishers receiving medals at the end.  The USSR won in its first attempt, led by Vsevolod Bobrov who was recognized as the best forward of the tournament in the first ever presentation of Directorate Awards.

Description 

The USSR won their first five games before meeting up with the host, and defending champion, Sweden.  Sweden, having already lost 8-0 to Canada, desperately needed to beat the Soviets, but settled for a 1–1 tie.  The final game of the tournament pitted the East York Lyndhursts, representing Canada, against the USSR, both teams being undefeated. Tournament organizers believed the Canadians would cruise to their seventh straight win and had begun to sell tickets for a planned tie-breaking game between the Soviets and Swedes to determine the European Championship.  However the Soviets "appeared to pass too much, check too little, and skate too fast" and "thoroughly dominated" in a 7–2 win before 16,000 fans.

Canadian Amateur Hockey Association (CAHA) president W. B. George stated that the final game was the worst he had seen the Lyndhursts play and that they seemed afraid of being penalized. The CAHA was heavily criticized by media in Canada for the failure to win the World Championships, and writer Michael McKinley stated the loss was a "day of reckoning" and a symbol of what went wrong with the CAHA's international strategy, and the beginning of a hockey rivalry with the Soviet Union.

Beginning with this year the IIHF began giving out official awards (known as the "directorate awards") to the best forward, defensemen, and goaltender, of the tournament.

Final round

Standings

Team members

Nikolai Puchkov
Grigori Mkrtychan
Alfred Kuchevsky
Dmitri Ukolov
Alexander Vinogradov
Genrikh Sidorenkov
Vsevolod Bobrov
Viktor Shuvalov
Alexei Guryshev
Yuri Krylov
Mikhail Bychkov
Alexander Uvarov
Valentin Kusin
Yevgeni Babich
Nikolai Khlystov
Alexander Komarov

Tournament awards
 Best players selected by the directorate:
 Best Goaltender:  Don Lockhart
Best Defenceman:  Lars Björn
Best Forward:  Vsevolod Bobrov

European Championships final rankings

Citations

References
Complete results

External links
The event at SVT's open archive 

Men's World Championships
IIHF Men's World Ice Hockey Championships
International ice hockey competitions hosted by Sweden
Ice Hockey World Championships
Ice Hockey World Championships
Ice Hockey World Championships
Ice Hockey World Championships, 1954
Ice Hockey World Championships, 1954
Cham